The fifth series of Ex on the Beach, a British television programme, began on 16 August 2016 on MTV, and concluded on 18 October 2016 after ten episodes. The series was confirmed on 8 March 2016 after the final episode of the fourth series, where it was also announced that past contestants would return to the series with "unfinished business". On 5 July 2016, it was confirmed that this would be an "All stars" series with all eight cast members previously appearing in past series. They were eventually joined by exes which also included ex-cast members as well as new ones. The series was filmed in Koh Samui, Thailand. 

While the series was airing, Stephen Bear took part in the eighteenth series of Celebrity Big Brother. He later went on to win the series. David Hawley later returned to the beach for the seventh series. Kayleigh also went on to appear in the eighteenth series of Big Brother, but was removed from the house on Day 13 due to threatening behaviour. Later in the year, in August 2017, both Jemma Lucy and Jordan Davies took part in the twentieth series of Celebrity Big Brother, who were both followed by Jess Impiazzi, who later went onto appear in the twenty-first series.

Cast
After the series four finale, it was confirmed that a fifth series would feature old faces with "unfinished" business. The official list of cast members were released on 5 July 2016. It features four boys and four girls from previous series. From the first series it includes Chloe Goodman and Liam Lewis. Geordie Shore star Gaz Beadle and Jess Impiazzi return having previously appeared in the second series, while Jemma Lucy, Jordan Davies and Stephen Bear from the third series all return. Finally Olivia Walsh returns having previously appeared in series 4. 

All original cast members arrived at the beach during the first episode and were immediately told to prepare for the arrival of their exes. Bear's ex-one night stand Kayleigh Morris made her return to the beach during the first episode having previously appeared in Series 2, and was later joined by the first new cast member of the series David Hawley who turned up to cause trouble for his ex-girlfriend Jemma. Charlotte Dawson made her debut during the second episode as a face from Gaz's past, while Bear was given the choice to send somebody home. He chose Chloe.  Jess decides to follow Chloe during the third episode as she voluntarily leaves the villa. Bear's second ex and Series 3 star Holly Rickwood also arrives during this episode with a score to settle. This episode also features the return of Series 1 and 2 cast member Ashley Cain, who arrives as Kayleigh's ex. The fourth episode saw the debut of Gaz's next ex, Lillie Lexie Gregg who arrived wanting closure from their break-up, and the Tablet of Terror delivered another shock when Olivia was forced to choose send somebody home. She chose Liam. During the fifth episode, Holly's ex-boyfriend Conor Sculock showed up at the beach with an axe to grind. The sixth episode featured the arrival of Gaz's third ex Chrysten, who arrived with a big secret set to destroy his time in the villa. Alex Stewart made his debut during the seventh episode wanting to rekindle the romance between his ex-girlfriend Charlotte. This episode also featured the departure of Jordan following a twist from the Tablet of Terror, and Jemma after she chose to leave following another violent showdown. The eighth episode included the arrival of Aimee Kimber as she made it her mission to stir up trouble for her ex-boyfriend Conor. Melissa Reeves returned to the beach during the ninth episode as Ashley and Gaz's ex having previously appeared in Series 2. The final ex to arrive was Series 1 star Joss Mooney, who returned to the beach during the tenth episode as the ex of both Kayleigh and Olivia.

Bold indicates original cast member; all other cast were brought into the series as an ex.

Duration of cast

Table Key
 Key:  = "Cast member" is featured in this episode
 Key:  = "Cast member" arrives on the beach
 Key:  = "Cast member" has an ex arrive on the beach
 Key:  = "Cast member" arrives on the beach and has an ex arrive during the same episode
 Key:  = "Cast member" leaves the beach
 Key:  = "Cast member" does not feature in this episode

Episodes

{| class="wikitable plainrowheaders" style="width:100%"
|- style="color:black"
! style="background:#81F7D8;"| No. inseries
! style="background:#81F7D8;"| No. inseason
! style="background:#81F7D8;"| Title
! style="background:#81F7D8;"| Original air date
! style="background:#81F7D8;"| Duration
! style="background:#81F7D8;"| UK viewers

|}

Ratings

References

External links
Official website

2016 British television seasons
05